SS Lunsford Richardson was a Liberty ship built in the United States during World War II. She was named after Lunsford Richardson, a pharmacist and founder of the Vick Chemical Company.

Construction
Lunsford Richardson was laid down on 2 August 1944, under a Maritime Commission (MARCOM) contract, MC hull 2374, by J.A. Jones Construction, Brunswick, Georgia; she was sponsored by Mrs. E.W. Stetson, and launched on 9 September 1944.

History
She was allocated to William J. Rountree Company, on 22 September 1944. On 11 October 1947, she was laid up in the National Defense Reserve Fleet in Wilmington, North Carolina. On 12 April 1961, she was sold for $51,515, to Northern Metal Company, for scrapping. She was removed from the fleet on 21 April 1961.

References

Bibliography

 
 
 
 
 

 

Liberty ships
Ships built in Brunswick, Georgia
1944 ships
Wilmington Reserve Fleet